The Wenkbach is a tributary of the river Lahn in Weimar (Lahn), Hesse, Germany.

See also 
 List of rivers of Hesse

Rivers of Hesse
Rivers of Germany